Sonny Boy Williamson & the Yardbirds is a live album by Chicago blues veteran Sonny Boy Williamson II backed by English rock band the Yardbirds. It was recorded at the Crawdaddy Club in Richmond, Surrey on December 8, 1963.  However, the performances were not released until early 1966, after a string of Top 40 hits by the Yardbirds.

Williamson sings and/or plays the harmonica on all of the songs.  Although they are in a supporting role, the album also presents some of the earliest recordings by the Yardbirds, whose members included Eric Clapton on lead guitar.  Numerous reissues have appeared over the years, sometimes with additional tracks recorded around the same time.

Background
German music impresarios Horst Lippmann and Fritz Rau organized the first annual American Folk Blues Festival in 1962.  They arranged for several well-known American blues artists to perform in concert in several European cities. Sonny Boy Williamson participated during the second festival tour in 1963 and his performances are identified as some of the most memorable of the festival.  At the conclusion of the festival, he returned to England for a more extensive club tour.

The Yardbirds' manager, Giorgio Gomelsky, who promoted some of the early American Folk Blues Festivals in England, persuaded Lippmann to attend one of the group's shows (by another account, Williamson also saw one of their performances).  A deal was struck and the Yardbirds backed Williamson for several English dates between December 1963 and February 1964.  Part of the arrangement included that Lippmann and Rau record some live performances (as they had done for the festival tour) and finance a solo studio demo by the group.

At their first meeting, Clapton wanted to impress Williamson with his familiarity with American blues and asked "Isn't your real name Rice Miller?" (the Yardbirds had been performing "Good Morning Little Schoolgirl", which is often attributed to John Lee Williamson, also known as "Sonny Boy Williamson I"; "Rice Miller" is one of several names associated with "Sonny Boy Williamson II"). According to Clapton, Williamson "slowly pulled out a small penknife and glared at me. It went downhill from there".

Williamson and the group rehearsed for their upcoming club performances and prepared a set list. Yardbirds' rhythm guitarist Chris Dreja recalled:

Recording
December 7, 1963 at the Star Hotel, Croydon
Gomelsky indicates that two songs were recorded; however, Yardbirds' chronicler Gregg Russo notes that this was a rehearsal and that attendees have stated that the only recordings took place the following night.
Sonny Boy Williamson backed by the Yardbirds:
"Take It Easy Baby" (version 1)
"Do the Weston"  (version 1)

December 8, 1963 at the Crawdaddy Club, Richmond
The Yardbirds (without Williamson):
"Smokestack Lightning"
"Let It Rock"
"Honey in Your Hips"
"I Wish You Would"
"You Can't Judge a Book by Its Cover"
"Who Do You Love?"

Williamson (solo):
"Baby Don't  Worry"
"I Don't Care No More"

Williamson backed by the Yardbirds:
"Bye Bye Bird"
"Mister Downchild"
"The River Rhine"
"23 Hours Too Long"
"A Lost Care"
"Pontiac Blues"
"Take It Easy Baby" (version 2)
"Out on the Water Coast"
"Western Arizona"  "Do the Weston" (version 2)

February 28, 1964 at the Birmingham Town Hall
Williamson backed by the Yardbirds:
"Slow Walk" (only the last minute of the performance survivesit has the same instrumental backing as "The River Rhine")
"Highway 49"  "Pontiac Blues"
"My Little Cabin"

Williamson (solo):
"Bye Bye Bird"

Releases
Over two years after it was recorded, Sonny Boy Williamson & the Yardbirds was first released in the UK by Fontana Records on January 7, 1966.  With a somewhat different running order, it was released in the US a month later by Mercury Records on February 7, 1966.  The album coincided with a string of successful singles by the Yardbirds, that led music critic Richie Unterberger to label it "an exploitative album".  Although Williamson's photo and name were prominently displayed on the album cover, a more recent photo of the Yardbirds with Jeff Beck (who replaced Clapton in March 1965) in the foreground was used.  In Germany, the album was released by Star-Club Records, that had a connection to Lippmann and Rau.

Critical reception

In a retrospective review for AllMusic, Unterberger gave the album three out of five stars.  He notes that Sonny Boy Williamson sings well and that the album should be seen as a Williamson release "in the manner of the sides the Beatles cut in Hamburg supporting Tony Sheridan."  He describes the Yardbirds' and Clapton's playing as "extremely green" and "tentative".  The album did not appear on the record charts in the UK or US.

David French, in his biography of Yardbirds' singer Keith Relf, had a more negative view of the Yardbirds' performance:

Track listing
Original Fontana album

The songwriter credits are taken from the 1966 Fontana release, which indicates that all songs are written by Sonny Boy Williamson II, except as noted.  The album does not include running times.
Side 1
"Bye Bye Bird" (Willie Dixon, Williamson)
"Mister Downchild"
"23 Hours Too Long"
"Out on the Water Coast"
"Baby Don't Worry"
Side 2
"Pontiac Blues"
"Take It Easy Baby"
"I Don't Care No More"
"Do the Weston"

Original Mercury album

The running times are taken from the 1966 Mercury release.  The liner notes include "All selection composed by Sonny Boy Williamson II and published by BMI".
Side 1
"Bye Bye Bird"2:23
"Pontiac Blues"3:45
"Take It Easy Baby"4:09
"I Don't Care No More"3:18
"Do the Weston"4:00
Side 2
"Mister Downchild"3:56
"23 Hours Too Long"5:04
"Out on the Water Coast"3:00
"Baby Don't Worry"4:28

Reissues
Sonny Boy Williamson & the Yardbirds has been reissued numerous times.  Sometimes the tracks were resequenced and the cover art was updated with photos of the later period Yardbirds.  Questions over the ownership of the master tapes and the rights to authorize their release has led to many competing and overlapping albums.  Beginning in 1981, Lippmann and Rau began releasing other material recorded around the same time.  These albums sometimes included various combinations of additional recordings with Williamson, the Yardbirds' December 8, 1963, solo set, and early group demos.  In 1984, Gomelsky released the first of several box sets by the group, Shapes of Things, which also combined these tracks.  New albums continue to appear, sometimes packaged with recordings of Williamson backed by the Animals on December 30, 1963, and with Jimmy Page and Brian Auger in January 1965.

Personnel
 Sonny Boy Williamson IIvocal, harmonica
The Yardbirds
 Eric Claptonguitar
 Chris Drejaguitar
 Jim McCartydrums
 Paul Samwell-Smithbass
 Keith Relfhandclapping, shouting, foot-tapping

Footnotes

References

Sources

Sonny Boy Williamson II albums
The Yardbirds live albums
Albums produced by Giorgio Gomelsky
1966 live albums
Mercury Records live albums
Fontana Records live albums
Collaborative albums